Fettered by Fate is a mystery novel by Australian sporting novelist Arthur Wright, a murder story with a horse-racing backdrop, published in 1921.

Reception
According to The Queenslander "it is one of the best of Arthur Wright's books, and though Mr. Wright runs dangerously close to an anachronism in associating a survivor of a bushranging gang with modern motor cars that will not concern the reader who is looking for excitement." Another reviewer said "in its 22 chapters there is not a dull moment for the story moves rapidly and each page is crowned with incident."

References

External links
Fettered by Fate at AustLit
Fettered by Fate at National Archives of Australia
Serialised copy of story in World's News in 1919–20 – 20 Dec, 27 Dec, 3 Jan, 10 Jan, 17 Jan, 24 Jan, 31 Jan, 7 Feb, 14 Feb, 21 Feb, 28 Feb, 6 March, 13 March, 20 March 

1921 Australian novels
Australian mystery novels
Australian sports novels
Horse racing novels
Novels set in Australia